The Tour de Borneo is an annual professional road bicycle racing stage race held in the state of Sabah and the Federal Territory of Labuan in East Malaysia since 2012, named after Borneo where they are located. The race is part of the UCI Asia Tour and was classified by the International Cycling Union (UCI) as a 2.2 category races. The 2013 edition of the race was won by Ghader Mizbani of Iran.

Past winners

External links
 Official website of Tour de Borneo
 
 Statistics at the-sports.org
 Tour de Borneo at cqranking.com

Cycle races in Malaysia
UCI Asia Tour races
Recurring sporting events established in 2012
2012 establishments in Malaysia
Sport in Sabah